= Airport BLVD =

- Theatrical release poster
- Directed by: Alejandro Hendricks
- Written by: Alejandro Hendricks
- Produced by: Jamal Gamble; Brannin Webber; Trai Wade; Aaron Christmas
- Starring: Jamal Gamble; Toluwani; Kenny Duet; Mor Cohen; Matthew Wagner
- Cinematography: Spencer Greene
- Edited by: Brannin Webber
- Music by: Michael Hale Trio
- Production company: Lofi Films
- Release date: June 5, 2026 (Tribeca Festival)
- Running time: 90 minutes
- Country: United States
- Language: English

Airport BLVD is a 2026 American musical comedy-drama film written and directed by Alejandro Hendricks.

The film premiered at the Tribeca Festival on June 5, 2026.

== Premise ==
Set in the transforming streets of East Austin, this jazz-infused musical follows Xavier as he watches his community, friendships, and sense of home disappear. As the city evolves around him, Airport BLVD becomes a soulful, romantic, and bittersweet love letter to a city old and new.

== Cast ==
- Jamal Gamble as Xavier
- Toluwani as Destiny
- Kenny Duet as Kenny
- Mor Cohen
- Matthew Wagner

== Production ==
Principal photography had been completed in 2025, on a musical comedy-drama film titled Airport BLVD by filmmaker Alejandro Hendricks. It starred Jamal Gamble, Toluwani, Kenny Duet, Mor Cohen, and Matthew Wagner. The film was also a recipient of the New Texas Voices Award. In April 2026, the film was selected to screen at the Tribeca Festival.

== Release ==
Airport BLVD premiered at the Tribeca Festival on June 5, 2026.
